Fourth grade (also called grade four, equivalent to Year 5 in England and Wales, and Year 4 in Australia) is a year of Elementary education in some countries. In North America, the fourth grade is the fifth school year of elementary school. Students are usually 9 or 10 years old. It can be considered a part of elementary school, traditionally providing instruction for young pupils in grades 3, 4 or 5. This can vary in different school districts; in some, fourth grade is the first or second year of intermediate school. In others, it may be the last year of elementary.

Argentina's equivalent
In Argentina, the minimum age required for the fourth grade is between 9 and 10 years old. In this situation, the children who are in the middle of primary school perform the "confirmation of loyalty to the homeland". This is an act in which a child will have to take an oath to defend Argentina for the rest of his or her life. Sometimes children take a trip to Rosario, where they raise the National Flag Memorial.

Australia's equivalent

In Australia, this level of class is called Year 4. Children generally start this level between the ages of nine and ten.

Brazil's equivalent
In Brazil, fourth grade is the quarto ano do Ensino Fundamental I. To enter in the fourth grade, all children students must be 9 years old before the cut-off date. The minimum age to enter in the fourth grade is 9 years old.

Canada's equivalent
In Canada, the fourth year of elementary education is referred to as Grade 4.

China's equivalent
In China, the fourth year of elementary education is referred to as Grade 4. Children are usually 9 or 10 years old at the fourth grade in elementary school.

The Dutch and Belgian equivalent
In The Netherlands, the fourth year of school is called group 6, and the pupils are 9 to 10 years old. Children start school at the age of 4 and end school at the ages of 12 or 13. In Belgium, it is called 4th (study) year. The children are also between the ages of 9 and 10.

France's equivalent
In France, the equivalent to the above-grade is the Level 1 Intermediate Course, known by its short-form CM1 (cours moyen 1re année).

Germany's equivalent
In Germany, the equivalent grade is 4. Klasse. In some German states this is the year where parents have to decide what kind of school their children should master: The "Mittelschule" that usually ends with 9th grade, the "Realschule" that ends with 10th grade and allows pupils to get a better starting point for their choice of working place or the "Gymnasium" that ends either with 12th grade or 13th grade (depending on the state) and is the only direct way to go to university.

Greece's equivalent
In Greece, the fourth school year of primary education school is referred to as the Fourth Grade of Primary (Tetarti - Τετάρτη Δημοτικού).

India's equivalent
In India, where children enter Class 4 at the ages 9 to 10 it is called Lower Primary, it is known as the fourth grade. 5-7 standard categories as Upper Primary(UP). Lower Primary gives the basic education necessary for a kid and when they gets to the UP section, advanced knowledge will be provided as lessons or modules.

Ireland's equivalent
In The Republic of Ireland, the equivalent is Fourth Class or Rang a Ceathair (for 9- to 10-year-olds), which is year 6 of Primary School.

New Zealand's equivalent
In New Zealand, this level of class is called Standard 3 or Year 5. Children generally start at this level between the ages of nine and ten.

Portugal's equivalent
In Portugal, what North Americans would call the fourth grade (quarto ano, 4º ano to Portuguese people) is the fourth and last year of the four-year 1º Ciclo do Ensino Básico which also includes the first grade, the second grade, and the third grade. Students take final exams (provas finais) for Portuguese and Mathematics at the end of the fourth grade since the school year of 2012/2013.

United Kingdom
In England, compulsory education begins with the first new term of the Reception year following a child's 5th birthday. In practice, many children enter Reception at the beginning of the school year, aged 4.  Fourth grade is the equivalent of 'Year 5' (ages 9–10) in England and Wales, Primary 6 in Northern Ireland and Primary 6 in Scotland - the sixth year of compulsory education in England, Wales, Scotland and Northern Ireland.

United States' equivalent
In the United States, most children enter the public school education system between ages 4–6 and start with Kindergarten. Kindergarten historically has not been required in all states. Children are divided into year groups or grades based on age or test results, depending upon local school board decisions; in Fourth Grade students are usually 9–10 years old and typically attending an Elementary School. Standard subjects include Math, Science, Social Studies, English, Creative Writing, and History including history of the founding of the United States, and one Elementary year is spent focusing on the history of the State the school is in. Some other subjects taught may include STEM, Spanish, German, Technology, gardening, Livestock, Environment, Shop class, Home Economics, Music, and Health. Public schools all offer health, music, art, and physical education. Children are typically between 8-9 at the start of the year and 9-10 at the end of the year, if they enter school on time and depending on their birthday placement.  In the United States as of 2019, 41 states have implemented Common Core State Standards Initiative standards for English/Language Arts and Mathematics

In Math, Kids learn about Place Value up to the millions, prime and composite numbers, multiplying 2 digit and 3 digit numbers, long division, fractions, decimals, the metric system, geometry etc.

In Social Studies, they learn about geography skills such as map reading and longitude and latitude, state history, and Early American History.

In Science, most common topics include the rock cycle, fossils, erosion, electricity, forces and motion, metric system, calculating liquid volume, calculating and converting temperature, light, and heat.

In English, kids learn skills about reading writing and vocabulary. These skills include finding theme of a story, compare and contrast, citing textual evidence, main idea, writing objective summaries, writing narratives, writing research reports, writing explanatory essays, writing persuasive and argumentative pieces, figurative language, prefixes, suffixes and context clues.

Spain's equivalent
In Spain, Primaria (6 to 12 years old) is compulsory for all children. 4th grade is called cuarto de Primaria or simply cuarto curso. Primaria starts at six years old, so students usually start 4th grade on the year of their tenth birthday.

See also
Educational stage
Singapore math method
Elementary schools in Japan

References 

4
Primary education